Búhos ULVR Fútbol Club, formerly called Guayaquil Sport Club is an Ecuadorian football club based in Guayaquil. It was the first football club in the country, has founded on April 23, 1899 by Juan Wright and Roberto Wright, the two brothers who brought the sport to the country. 

The club's only title came in the amateur era of Guayaquil football, when it won the regional league in 1943. It also played one season the top-flight Serie A in 1973, where it finished 12th. The club ceased operation in 1990 after 91 years of existence and has refounded on February 5, 2014. 

In 2020 after 45 years they return to the Serie B of Ecuador

Achievements

Segunda Categoria

 Champion (1): 2020

Campeonato Amateur del Guayas

Champion (1): 1943

External links
Official website
facebook
twitter
instagram

References

Defunct football clubs in Ecuador
Association football clubs established in 1899
1899 establishments in Ecuador